Passail is a municipality in the district of Weiz in the Austrian state of Styria.
It is situated approximately 30 kilometers north-east of the state capital Graz.

References

Cities and towns in Weiz District
Graz Highlands